Wadi Camacho is a Spanish-born British former professional boxer who competed from 2012 to 2019. He held the Commonwealth cruiserweight title from 2018 to 2019 and challenged for the British cruiserweight title in 2019.

Professional career

Early career 
Camacho made his professional debut on 28 January 2012, scoring a four-round points decision (PTS) victory over Moses Matovu at the York Hall in London. Camacho scored five more wins in 2012; Rolandas Cesna by technical knockout (TKO) in March; Igoris Borucha by PTS in May; Paul Morris with a stoppage via corner retirement (RTD) in June; and TKOs against Andrew Ingram in September and Hari Miles in December.

His first fight of 2013 came against China Clarke for the vacant English cruiserweight title on 9 March at the Wembley Arena, London. Camacho suffered his first defeat, losing via seventh-round RTD.

Prizefighter series

Following the defeat to Clarke, Camacho entered the 30th edition of the Prizefighter series, taking place on 18 May at the York Hall. He won his first two bouts by unanimous decision (UD), defeating Martin Grainger with all three judges scoring the bout 30–27, followed by Nathan Owens, with one judge scoring the bout 30–26 while the other two scored it 29–27. In the final he faced former foe Hari Miles, who he beat six months earlier via seventh-round TKO. In the second round of his final bout of the night, Camacho landed three hard body shots, forcing Miles to go down on one knee. After making it to his feet before the referee's count of ten, Miles was met with another flurry of punches to put him down for the second time. Miles was unable to make it to his feet before the count of ten, awarding Camacho a second-round knockout (KO) victory to win the tournament along with the £32,000 prize, plus an addition £2,000 for scoring a stoppage win.

Title contention

British title eliminator
His next fight was a TKO win against Atilla Palko one month later before facing Tony Conquest in an eliminator for the British cruiserweight title on 5 October 2013 at The O2 Arena, London. After knocking his opponent down twice, Camacho went on to suffer the second defeat of his career, losing via UD over ten rounds. Two judges scored the bout 96–93 while the other scored it 95–94, all in favour of Conquest.

WBC International title

After scoring TKO wins against John Anthony in December 2013 and Toni Visic in April 2014, he faced Stephen Simmons for the WBC International Silver cruiserweight title on 27 June at the Braehead Arena in Glasgow. The pair were previously scheduled to fight on 1 March, but Simmons was forced to withdraw from the bout after suffering a broken rib. After a back-and-forth fight over nine rounds, Camacho was dropped to the canvas in the tenth and final round. He made it to his feet on unsteady legs, only to be met with a big right hand from Simmons, prompting the referee to call a halt to the contest, handing Camacho a TKO loss.

Southern Area champion

Following his loss to Simmons he suffered consecutive defeats to Craig Kennedy; the first being a second-round disqualification (DQ) for allegedly biting Kennedy on the shoulder in October 2014 and a seventh-round TKO in March 2015.

He bounced back from his three consecutive defeats by scoring PTS wins against Yavor Marinchev in October and Jindrich Velecky in January 2016. Camacho next faced Dan Woodgate for the vacant Southern Area cruiserweight title on 27 February 2016 at the York Hall. Camacho dropped Woodgate to the canvas in the fifth round with a left hook followed by an uppercut, leaving Woodgate with a cut above his right eye. After making it to his feet before the referee's count of ten he was met with a barrage of punches while pinned against the ropes, prompting the referee to step in and call a halt to the contest to save Woodgate from further punishment, awarding Camacho the Southern Area title by way of a fifth-round TKO. 

He successfully defended the title in July – stopping Danny Couzens via sixth-round RTD – before facing Isaac Chamberlain on 29 September 2016 at the York Hall. In his second defence of the Southern Area title, Camacho lost by PTS, with referee Jeff Hinds scoring the bout 98–94 in favour of Chamberlain. After Chamberlain vacated the title, Camacho got the opportunity to fight for it once again in his next fight, this time against Karl Wheeler on 18 March 2017 at the York Hall. Camacho dropped Wheeler to the canvas with a body shot in round five. Wheeler was able to make it to his feet before the referee finished his count of ten, but deemed Wheeler unfit to continue, handing Camacho a fifth-round TKO win to recapture the Southern Area title.

Second attempt at the English title

In his next fight he made a second attempt to capture the English cruiserweight title, facing Arfan Iqbal on 9 July at the York Hall. After starting the fourth round as the aggressor, Camacho took a big right hand to the head which left him against the ropes on unsteady legs. Referee Phil Edwards stepped in to call a halt to the contest after Iqbal landed two more clean punches, handing Camacho his seventh defeat, losing via fourth-round TKO.

Retaining the Southern Area title 
Following his second failed attempt at the English title, Camacho still maintained the Southern Area belt. He was scheduled to make his first defence – since winning the title against Karl Wheeler in March – on 23 September 2017 against Jose Lopes at the York Hall. After Lopes was forced to withdraw due to injury, Ossie Jervier – who was scheduled to fight in an eliminator for the title – stepped in as a late replacement. Camacho retained his title via PTS. He successfully defended the title twice more; scoring a PTS win against Jose Lopes in a rescheduled bout in November followed by a TKO win in a rematch against former victim Danny Couzens in March 2018.

Commonwealth champion 
Following the win over Couzens, Camacho took another rematch, this time against former conqueror Arfan Iqbal. The bout took place on 17 November 2018 at the York Hall, with the vacant Commonwealth cruiserweight title up for grabs. The bout was stopped in the seventh round after Iqbal fell through the ropes. With an injured back and unable to continue, the decision rested on the judges' scorecards. Two judges scored the bout 69–63 while the third scored it 68–64, all in favour of Camacho, awarding him the Commonwealth title via unanimous technical decision (TD).

His first defence came against British cruiserweight champion, Lawrence Okolie, on 23 March 2019 at the Copper Box Arena, London, as part of the undercard for Charlie Edwards' world title defence against Angel Moreno. After struggling with Okolie's power in the first two rounds, Camacho found some success in the third by landing a clean left hand. In the fourth, Okolie landed a big right to send Camacho down on one knee. After beating the referee's count of ten he was met with another powerful right hand, promoting the referee to call a halt to the contest, handing Camacho the eighth defeat of his career and awarding Okolie the Commonwealth title via fourth-round TKO.

Outside of boxing
On 3 October 2019 Camacho was arrested for terrorism offences. He said of the arrest, "I'm just so confused, it's something else. I've been a professional boxer for eight or nine years; I'm known to the police, I don't socialise with bad people, I have a good team around me. It's unbelievable. They arrested me yesterday for suspected terorism. I don't know what's next, I don't have no phone. I'm bailed until October 29; it's bonkers." 

London police subsequently released a statement on the matter, saying, "A man who was arrested in east London on suspicion of terrorism offences has been released on bail. The man, who is in his 30s, was arrested on Wednesday 2 October on suspicion of collection of information of a kind likely to be useful to a person committing or preparing an act of terrorism under section 58 of the Terrorist Act."

Professional boxing record

References

External links

Living people
Year of birth missing (living people)
Date of birth missing (living people)
Spanish emigrants to the United Kingdom
British male boxers
Boxers from Barcelona
Cruiserweight boxers
Southpaw boxers
Commonwealth Boxing Council champions